Natural monuments of North Korea is a natural monuments system that designates natural resources that are designated as significant to the North korean government.  A total of 469 natural monument entries have been designated from no.1 to no. 935.

History
North Korea first established a law made to protect natural heritage in 1946 April 29th, but was abolished and was revised with new rules of administrating it in 1990.

Designation standards
The designations are not only considered in a academic,aesthetic and  economic perspective, but also designated based on whether it has significant revolutionary history regarding the ruling Kim family of north korea.For plants it can be something the Kim family planted themselves, for geology it can be things that they named themselves, or important in terms of cult of personality, such as Mount Paektu and Samjiyon lake, for animals it can be things that were paid attention to by the Kim family.

List

No. 1 - 50
Missing numbers are simply numbers that are not designated with natural monuments.

50-100
Missing numbers are simply numbers that are not designated with natural monuments.

No. 101 - 150
Missing numbers are simply numbers that are not designated with natural monuments.

No.151-No.200
Missing numbers are simply numbers that are not designated with natural monuments.

No.201-250

No. 251 - 300

No. 301 - 350

No. 351 - 400

No.401-No.526

No.527-No.900
From 527 to 900, no natural monument is designated, and is nothing but a vacant number.

No.901-935

Natural monuments with unidentified numbers
Some numbers of  natural monuments had not been revealed.

See also

Natural monuments of South Korea
Geography of North Korea

References

 
North Korea-related lists
Nature conservation in North Korea